Scott Robinson (born 12 March 1992) is a Scottish professional footballer who plays as a midfielder for Kilmarnock. He has previously played for Heart of Midlothian, Kilmarnock, Dunfermline Athletic, East Fife and Livingston. Robinson made his debut appearance for Heart of Midlothian aged 16, which made him the youngest ever player to appear in the Scottish Premier League.

Career

Club
Robinson was born in Edinburgh on 12 March 1992 and attended Royal Mile Primary and Boroughmuir High School and played for Hutchison Vale Boys Club before signing his first professional contract at Hearts in April 2008.

He made his first team debut as a substitute on 26 April 2008, as a striker, against Inverness Caledonian Thistle in Hearts 1–0 win at Tynecastle Stadium. In doing so he became the youngest player in SPL history and also the youngest player to have ever played competitive football for Hearts. He was 16 years, 1 month and 14 days old. He was given a new contract on 14 July 2008, extending his stay until 2011.

Robinson spent the following season playing reserve and under 19 fixtures to gain experience. He returned to first team football on 26 September 2009, against Hamilton as a substitute, going on to score his first competitive goal for Hearts in a 1–1 draw with Rangers at Ibrox on 23 January 2010. He made 14 appearances in total that season.

Having impressed during his four first team appearances during the 2010–11 season, Robinson was awarded a new two-year deal, extending his stay until 2013. Robinson featured during pre-season in Germany for the 2011–12 season and began to establish himself as a regular under new manager Paulo Sergio at the start of the season, in a new central midfield role. He made his European debut against Tottenham Hotspur at White Hart Lane. He played as a substitute as Hearts won the 2012 Scottish Cup Final.

On 3 June 2015, Robinson joined Kilmarnock on a three-year deal. Towards the end of March 2016, Robinson joined Dunfermline Athletic on trial after being released by Kilmarnock,
 subsequently signing a short-term contract as an amateur for the Scottish League One side at the start of April 2016. Robinson made his debut in a two-all draw with Forfar Athletic at East End Park. After making just two appearances for the Pars, Robinson was released by the club at the end of his contract in May 2016. Shortly after leaving Dunfermline, Robinson signed for Fife rivals East Fife.

On 11 May 2017, Robinson signed a pre-contract with Livingston.

International
Robinson has represented Scotland at U16, U17 and U19 level.

His first appearance for Scotland came at under 17 level against Malta on 14 January 2008. With his first goals for Scotland coming at under 16 level scoring twice against Spain on 2 February 2008 and on 16 August 2010 he captained the under 19 squad in an International Challenge Match against Malta.

Career statistics

References

External links

Profile at londonhearts.com

1992 births
Living people
Footballers from Edinburgh
Scottish footballers
Association football forwards
Heart of Midlothian F.C. players
Kilmarnock F.C. players
Dunfermline Athletic F.C. players
East Fife F.C. players
Livingston F.C. players
Scottish Premier League players
Scotland youth international footballers
Scottish Professional Football League players
Lothian Thistle Hutchison Vale F.C. players
People educated at Boroughmuir High School